Mpesela Ntlot Soeu (born 17 January 1977) is a Lesotho long-distance runner. He competed in the men's marathon at the 2004 Summer Olympics.

References

1977 births
Living people
Athletes (track and field) at the 2004 Summer Olympics
Lesotho male long-distance runners
Lesotho male marathon runners
Olympic athletes of Lesotho
Place of birth missing (living people)